A330 usually refers to the Airbus A330, a 1992 long-range widebody airliner created by Airbus Industrie.

A330 may also refer to:

 A330 road (Great Britain), a road in Zone 3 of the Great Britain numbering scheme
 Aero A.330, a Czechoslovak biplane
 Van Hool A330 transit bus, a part of the Van Hool A3 transit bus series